Caroline Kaplan is an American film producer.

Filmography
She was a producer in all films unless otherwise noted.

Film

Thanks

Television

Miscellaneous crew

External links

American film producers
Living people
Year of birth missing (living people)